Stefan Zawadzki (born 1946 in Jasieniec, Poland) is a Polish historian, a researcher of Ancient Near East history. He is a professor at Adam Mickiewicz University. He has written a number of monographs.

References

20th-century Polish historians
Polish male non-fiction writers
1946 births
Living people
21st-century Polish historians
Academic staff of Adam Mickiewicz University in Poznań